The 1956 Macdonald Brier, the Canadian men's national curling championship, was held from March 5 to 9, 1956 at Moncton Stadium in Moncton, New Brunswick. A total of 25,800 fans attended the event.

Both Team Manitoba and Team Ontario finished tied for first in round robin play with 8-2 records, necessitating a tiebreaker playoff between the two teams. Manitoba, who was skipped by Billy Walsh defeated Ontario in the tiebreaker 8–7 in an extra end to capture the Brier Tankard in what is considered to be one of the greatest Brier finishes of all time. The game would come down to the last rock as Walsh delivered a perfect shot which snuck past the Ontario guard, then knocked the Ontario shot rock out of play while Walsh's rock managed to bite the 12 foot to capture the Brier championship. Walsh's winning shot was ranked 19th by TSN in their Top 50 Curling Shots of All Time segment.

This was Manitoba's fifteenth Brier championship and the second won by Walsh as a skip, with his first being in 1952. This was the first time in which a championship tiebreaker would go to an extra end and only the second time in which any tiebreaker game would go to an extra end (the other was the second place tiebreaker in 1931).

Event Summary
Heading into the Thursday evening draw (Draw 9), Manitoba was unbeaten with a 7–0 record with Ontario right behind with a 6–1 record while Alberta, Nova Scotia, and Saskatchewan had an outside shot with 4-3 records. On the Thursday evening draw,  Alberta would be eliminated with an 11–7 loss to Northern Ontario while Saskatchewan defeated Quebec 11–5. Nova Scotia would defeat previously unbeaten Manitoba 15–4. Ontario took advantage and beat Newfoundland 10–8 to tie Manitoba in the standings heading into the final day.

In the first matches on the final day, Ontario would lose to British Columbia 11-9 opening the door for Manitoba to be in the drivers seat heading into the final draw. Manitoba would do just that as they defeated Alberta 11-5 leaving Manitoba and Ontario as the only two teams that could win the Brier.

In the final draw in the afternoon, Manitoba was sitting with an 8–1 record while Ontario had a 7–2 record. A Manitoba win would have them clinch the Brier outright while Ontario needed a win against Nova Scotia and a Manitoba loss against Saskatchewan to force a tiebreaker playoff that evening. In the final draw, Ontario trailed 9–6 against Nova Scotia with two ends remaining, but Ontario would score five in the eleventh end then steal three in the last end to win 15–9. Saskatchewan handed Manitoba their second defeat of the Brier with a 12–10 win, which forced a tiebreaker playoff that evening between Manitoba and Ontario.

The tiebreaker game between Manitoba and Ontario would be an instant classic. After the first end was blanked, Ontario would strike first with two in the second but Manitoba would counter and tie the game at 2 after three ends. Both teams traded singles the next four ends, but Manitoba would take their first lead of the game at 5–4 with a steal of one in the eighth end. Ontario would tie the game with one in the ninth. Manitoba then scored one in the tenth and stole one in the eleventh to take a 7–5 lead heading into the final end. Ontario would score two in the last end to tie the game at 7. This meant for the first time ever that a tiebreaker playoff to decide a Brier would be decided in an extra end.

Manitoba would have the hammer in the extra end, which would come down to the final stone. With Ontario having shot rock within the four foot in addition of having a rock in front of the house guarding that rock, Billy Walsh would have his work cut out for him prior to his final stone. As he released the stone, it slid past the Ontario guard into the house. The rock then struck Ontario's shot stone, which would roll out of play. Walsh's stone would roll out and would stop just biting the 12 foot to score one and capture the Brier championship in one of the greatest Brier finishes of all time. Walsh's winning shot is still considered one of the top shots in Brier history.

Teams
The teams are listed as follows:

Round-robin standings

Round-robin results

All draw times are listed in Atlantic Time (UTC-04:00)

Draw 1
Monday, March 5 3:00 PM

Draw 2
Monday, March 5 8:00 PM

Draw 3
Tuesday, March 6 9:00 AM

Draw 4
Tuesday, March 6 2:00 PM

Draw 5
Wednesday, March 7 2:00 PM

Draw 6
Wednesday, March 7 8:00 PM

Draw 7
Thursday, March 8 9:00 AM

Draw 8
Thursday, March 8 3:00 PM

Draw 9
Thursday, March 8 8:00 PM

Draw 10
Friday, March 9 9:30 AM

Draw 11
Friday, March 9 2:30 PM

Playoff 
Friday, March 9

References

External links 
 Video: 

Macdonald Brier, 1956
Macdonald Brier, 1956
The Brier
Curling competitions in Moncton
Macdonald Brier
Macdonald Brier